The 1997 Volta a la Comunitat Valenciana was the 55th edition of the Volta a la Comunitat Valenciana road cycling stage race, which was held from 25 February to 1 March 1997. The race started in Elche and finished in Valencia. The race was won by Juan Carlos Domínguez of the  team.

General classification

References

Volta a la Comunitat Valenciana
Volta a la Comunitat Valenciana
Volta a la Comunitat Valenciana
[[Category:March 1997 sports events in Europe|Volta a la Comunitat Valenciana]